Moruya High School is a government-funded co-educational comprehensive secondary day school, located in Moruya, in the South Coast region of New South Wales, Australia.

The school enrolled approximately 570 students in 2018, from Year 7 to Year 12, of whom 15 percent identified as Indigenous Australians and four percent were from a language background other than English. The school is operated by the NSW Department of Education; the principal is Richard Schell.

See also 

 List of government schools in New South Wales
 Education in Australia

References

External links 
 

Public high schools in New South Wales
South Coast (New South Wales)